József Tóth is the name of:

József Tóth (footballer, born 1929) (1929–2017), Hungarian footballer who played in the 1954 FIFA World Cup
József Tóth (hydrogeologist) (born 1933), Canadian scientist
József Tóth (footballer, born 1951) (1951–2022), Hungarian footballer who played in the 1978 and 1982 FIFA World Cup
József Tóth (geographer) (1940–2013), Hungarian geographer and academic
József Tóth (politician, born 1950) (born 1950), Hungarian Member of Parliament (MSZP) and Mayor of Angyalföld
József Tóth (politician, born 1953) (born 1953), Hungarian Member of Parliament (Fidesz) and Mayor of Tiszanána

See also
 József